Milking the Rhino is a 2009 documentary film, produced by Kartemquin Films, that examines the relationship between the indigenous African wildlife, the villagers who live amongst this wildlife and conservationists who look to keep tourism dollars coming in.  Both the Maasai of Kenya and the Ovahimba of Namibia have spent centuries as cattle farmers.  With their lands being turned into protected game reserves, these ancient tribes have turned to tourism as a means of survival.

While some environmentalists think that community-based conservation is ideal for these villagers, the dangers of drought and the starvation of their cattle remains a constant reality.  Stuck between the always growing Western influence that wants Africa to remain a place for sight-seeing safaris and their own ancient cultures, the Maasai and Himba are at a crossroads of cultural change.

The Kenyan section of the movie features interviews with Kinanjui Lesenderia, an Ndorobo Maasai elder at Il Ngwesi in Kenya, Ian Craig, former rancher and founder of the Lewa Wildlife Conservancy, James Ole Kinyaga, Senior Host of Kenya's first community-owned and managed eco-lodge and Helen Gichohi, President of the African Wildlife Foundation.

Produced by Kartemquin Films and directed by David E. Simpson, Milking the Rhino won numerous awards at multiple international film festivals, including Best Documentary at the Pan African Film Festival and San Luis Obispo International Film Festival.   On April 7, 2009, Milking the Rhino made its television premiere on PBS's Independent Lens.

References

External links
Official site
Kartemquin Films
Independent Lens

"Milking the Rhino" Official Trailer
Jeannie Magill, co-producer of Milking the Rhino, interviewed on Conversations from Penn State

2009 films
2009 documentary films
American documentary films
Ojihimba-language films
Swahili-language films
Documentary films about environmental issues
Films shot in Namibia
Films shot in Kenya
Kartemquin Films films
2000s English-language films
2000s American films